Chlorphentermine (trade names Apsedon, Desopimon, Lucofen) is a serotonergic appetite suppressant of the amphetamine family. Developed in 1962, it is the 4-chloro derivative of the better known appetite suppressant phentermine, which is still in current use.

Chlorphentermine acts as a highly selective serotonin releasing agent (SRA). It is not a psychostimulant and has little or no abuse potential, but is classed as a Schedule III drug in the USA due mainly to its similarity to other appetite suppressants such as diethylpropion which have been more widely abused. It is no longer used due mainly to safety concerns, as it has a serotonergic effects profile similar to other withdrawn appetite suppressants such as fenfluramine and aminorex which were found to cause pulmonary hypertension and cardiac fibrosis following prolonged use.

The plasma half-life is about five days.  It was withdrawn from the market in the UK in 1974.

See also 

 Aminorex
 Cericlamine
 Cloforex
 Clortermine
 Etolorex
 Fenfluramine
 Methylenedioxyphentermine
 Phentermine

References 

5-HT2B agonists
Anorectics
Carbonic anhydrase activators
Chlorobenzenes
Serotonin receptor agonists
Serotonin releasing agents
Substituted amphetamines
Withdrawn drugs